Kirill Dmitriyevich Kaplenko (born 15 June 1999) is a Belarusian football player who plays as a defensive midfielder for Orenburg.

Club career
He made his debut in the Russian Football National League for FC Zenit-2 St. Petersburg on 22 July 2017 in a game against FC Tyumen.

He made his Russian Premier League debut for FC Zenit St. Petersburg on 18 September 2017 in a game against FC Ufa.

On 21 February 2020 he was loaned to Orenburg. The loan was extended for the 2020–21 season on 30 July 2020. On 14 June 2022, Orenburg bought out his rights from Zenit.

International
Kaplenko was born and raised in Belarus. Upon moving to Russia, he acquired Russian citizenship and was called up to the Russia national under-20 football team in September 2018. In fall 2017 he was called up to the Belarus national under-21 football team for the U21 Euro qualifying matches against Czech Republic and Greece, but rejected the invitation, citing his intention to represent Russia. After failing to attract interest from Russian national team, in 2022 Kaplenko accepted invite from Belarus. He made debut for the team 17 November 2022 in a friendly match against Syria.

Career statistics

Personal life
His older brother Nikita Kaplenko is also a footballer.

References

External links
 Profile by Russian Football National League
 
 

1999 births
Footballers from Minsk
Belarusian emigrants to Russia
Naturalised citizens of Russia
Living people
Belarusian footballers
Russian footballers
Russia youth international footballers
Belarus international footballers
Association football midfielders
FC Zenit-2 Saint Petersburg players
FC Zenit Saint Petersburg players
FC Orenburg players
Russian First League players
Russian Premier League players
Russian Second League players
Belarusian expatriate footballers
Expatriate footballers in Russia
Belarusian expatriate sportspeople in Russia